Vasko Naumovski (born 1980 in Skopje, Socialist Federal Republic of Yugoslavia) is a Macedonian diplomat and politician of VMRO-DPMNE, having served as a Deputy Prime Minister of the Republic of North Macedonia in Nikola Gruevski's government for the period of 2009–2011, responsible for the country's European integration.

In July 2014, the President of the Republic of North Macedonia, Gjorge Ivanov appointed Naumovski to be the country's Ambassador to the United States and special envoy in the talks over the Macedonia Naming Dispute which are conducted under the auspices of the United Nations. In October 2018, Naumovski was given a farewell celebration by the U.S. Department of State, indicating his imminent departure from the post.

References

http://hcdc.clubs.harvard.edu/article.html?aid=1095

1980 births
Living people
Diplomats from Skopje
Deputy Prime Ministers of North Macedonia
Ambassadors of North Macedonia to the United States
Politicians from Skopje